...di terra ("of earth", "earthen") is the seventh studio album by Italian progressive rock band Banco (previously called Banco del Mutuo Soccorso), released in 1978. It is an entirely instrumental work, recorded together with Orchestra dell'Unione Musicisti di Roma. The album's title is based on a poem of the same name by the band's vocalist Francesco Di Giacomo, with each song title a line from the poem.

Track listing

Personnel

 Vittorio Nocenzi — synthesizer, organ, electric piano
 Gianni Nocenzi — piano
 Rodolfo Maltese — electric guitar, acoustic guitar, trumpet
 Pier Luigi Calderoni — drums, timpani, percussion
 Renato D'Angelo — bass
 Alan King — saxophone, flute

Featuring Orchestra dell'Unione Musicisti di Roma, conducted by Vittorio Nocenzi, orchestration by Antonio Scarlato and Vittorio Nocenzi.

References

Banco del Mutuo Soccorso albums
1978 albums
Instrumental albums